is a Japanese footballer currently playing as a midfielder for Oita Trinita of the J1 League.

Career statistics

Club

Notes

References

External links 
 

2000 births
Living people
Sportspeople from Ōita Prefecture
Association football people from Ōita Prefecture
Japanese footballers
Association football midfielders
J1 League players
J3 League players
Oita Trinita players
Gainare Tottori players